Police Crop: The Winchester Conspiracy is a 1990 Australian television film based on Operation Seville and the assassination of Colin Winchester.

Plot
Television movie looking at the events surrounding the assassination of Federal Deputy Police Commissioner, Colin Winchester. Also known as 'Police State NSW' and 'The Black Hand'.

Cast
 Luciano Catenacci as Giuseppe Verduci
 Terry Gill as Det. Sgt. Bill Cullen
 Frankie J. Holden as Det. Con. Max Chapman
 Gerard Kennedy as Asst. Commissioner Colin Winchester
 Tim Robertson as Det. Sgt. Brian Lockwood

Release
Police Crop: The Winchester Conspiracy was released on ABC TV on March 21, 1990.

Home media
As of February 2023 the film has not received any Home Media Release.

References

External links

Police Crop at ABC
Police Crop at AustLit

Australian television films
1990 television films
1990 films
Films directed by Ken Cameron
1990s English-language films
1990s Australian films